Ray Alexander may refer to: 

Ray Alexander (gridiron football) (born 1962), American football player
Ray Alexander (musician) (1925–2002), jazz drummer and vibraphonist
Ray Alexander Simons (1914–2004), also known as Ray Alexander, South African communist and trade unionist